Northland is a New Zealand parliamentary electorate, returning one Member of Parliament to the New Zealand House of Representatives. The electorate was established for the 1996 election. It was represented by National Party MP John Carter from 1996 to 2011, and then National's Mike Sabin until his resignation on 30 January 2015. The by-election in March 2015 was won by New Zealand First party leader Winston Peters. Peters was defeated by National's Matt King in the 2017 general election. King in turn was defeated by the Labour Party's Willow-Jean Prime in the 2020 general election, who became the first Labour MP elected for the area since the party won the predecessor electorate Bay of Islands in 1938.

Population centres
Northland is the northernmost general electorate of New Zealand. The electorate encompasses the entire Far North District and Kaipara District, and a small rural section of Whangarei District. At the 2008 election, the town of Wellsford became part of Northland due to heavy population growth in the Rodney seat. No boundary adjustments were undertaken in the subsequent 2013/14 redistribution.
 Taipa Bay-Mangonui (2,050)
 Kaitaia
 Kerikeri
 Paihia
 Opua (860)
 Haruru Falls (870)
 Kawakawa
 Moerewa
 Kaikohe
 Dargaville
 Mangawhai Heads (1,086)

History
It was formed from the whole of the Far North electorate (called Bay of Islands before 1993), and a large section of the Hobson seat.

Carter left Parliament in June 2011 to take up a post as New Zealand's High Commissioner to the Cook Islands. His departure did not result in a by-election, as the vacancy occurred within six months of the next general election.

In May 2011 Mike Sabin was selected as the National Party candidate in place of Carter. In December 2014 news media reported that he was under investigation by police over an assault complaint. The reports were not confirmed by the New Zealand Police, the Prime Minister or Sabin himself. Sabin resigned from parliament on 30 January 2015 with immediate effect "due to personal issues that were best dealt with outside Parliament." The resignation forced a by-election in the electorate.

The by-election in March 2015 was won by New Zealand First party leader Winston Peters. Peters was later defeated by National's Matt King in the 2017 general election.

The electorate is one where National traditionally performs well; Labour did not win a general electorate north of Wellsford in any election from 1943 to 2017 besides a one-off victory in Whangarei in 1972. However, in the 2020 election, Northland elected its first ever Labour MP and the first Labour MP for the area for 77 years.

The upper North Island is also a place where New Zealand First has one of its strongest voter bases; in 1996, Ian Peters and Frank Grover of the Alliance beat Labour's candidate into fourth place and nine percent of the vote. Third parties do well in Northland - at the 1960 and 1963 elections, Social Credit candidate Vernon Cracknell came runner up in Hobson, before taking the seat with 48 percent of the vote in 1966. The area had previously been receptive to social credit theory - Harold Rushworth of the credit-influenced Country Party had held Bay of Islands for three terms, from 1928 to 1938.

Members of Parliament
Key

List MPs
Members of Parliament elected from party lists in elections where that person also unsuccessfully contested the Northland electorate. Unless otherwise stated, all MPs terms began and ended at general elections.

1 Grover left the Alliance in 1999 and joined the Christian Heritage Party.

Election results

2020 election

2017 election

2015 by-election

2014 election

2011 election

Electorate (as at 26 November 2011): 44,182

2008 election

2005 election

1999 election
Refer to Candidates in the New Zealand general election 1999 by electorate#Northland for a list of candidates.

Notes

References

External links
 Electorate Profile  Parliamentary Library

New Zealand electorates
1996 establishments in New Zealand